Deinacrida mahoenui, the Mahoenui giant wētā, is a flightless insect in the giant wētā family Anostostomatidae. It is endemic to the area of Mahoenui, New Zealand, and the world population for some time was restricted to a single patch of introduced gorse on farmland.

Description 

Females can be distinguished by their size and their long egg-laying spikes or ovipositors.

Uniquely amongst giant wētā, D. mahoenui has two colour morphs: mahogany brown (over two thirds of the population) and golden yellow (about 31%). A two-coloured female has even been found, having one side brown and the other yellow.

Reproduction 

Female Mahoenui giant wētā lay 200–400 eggs in autumn, burying them about 25 mm deep into the soil with their ovipositor. The eggs are about 7 mm long, and take 10 months to hatch, with the 8 mm nymphs emerging in March or April. Nymphs grow rapidly, eating other insects (they are cannibalistic) as well as leaves, bark, and leaf litter. They shed their exoskeleton every month until August, then bimonthly until February, going through 10 stages or instars.

Once they reach maturity in autumn, females signal they are ready to mate with pheromones in their droppings. Males follow this scent and caress the females with their antennae before mating takes place. Adults die after egglaying, just before winter. Their life cycle in total lasts 22–24 months, very short compared to some other species of large wētā which can live for over 10 years in captivity.

Habitat 
These giant wētā were first discovered living in tiny (1–5 hectare) remnants of tawa forest at Mahoenui, a small community in New Zealand's King Country. In 1987 a larger population was found nearby, living in farmland covered with introduced gorse.

Gorse is an invasive weed in New Zealand pasture, and not the wētā's natural habitat, but in combination with introduced livestock it had formed a refuge for the species. Cattle had opened out the gorse canopy, and browsing by goats have cropped it into thick hedges, impenetrable to the introduced rats that are the main threat to D. mahoenui.

Conservation 
Like most species of giant wētā, D. mahoenui are very vulnerable to introduced mammalian predators such as cats, stoats, possums, rats, and hedgehogs. The Mahoenui Giant Weta Scientific Reserve is also extremely vulnerable to fire, as gorse is very flammable.

Since 1989, more than 2,000 D. mahoenui have been relocated to seven mainland and island areas, but appear to be thriving at just two of these sites.

Some have been released near Waitomo Caves at Ruakuri Scenic Reserve, 200 were put onto Mahurangi Island near the Coromandel Peninsula, and 287 were released at Warrenheip, a 16 ha private reserve near Cambridge. In April 2012 up to 100 were introduced into the Maungatautari ecological area.

References

External links 

 Mahoenui giant wētā discussed on RNZ Critter of the Week, 8 July 2016

Weta
Anostostomatidae
Insects described in 1999